Masoja Josiah Msiza (born October 5, 1964) is a South African actor, poet and musician. He is best known for portraying "Nkunzi Mhlongo" in the award-winning telenovela Uzalo.

Early life 
Msiza was born in Kwa-Thema, a township in the South African province of Gauteng. His love for acting started when he was 9 years old and he enjoyed participating in art and drama classes. At the age of 14 he participated in a drama competition in his school which he won. After finishing school he found work as a miner and he eventually ended up being fired along with other miners who were involved in a strike. Following his dismissal, he decided to pursue his dream to become an actor and his debut gig was featured in a play called "Mfowethu" which was directed by Gibson Kente.

Career 
Msiza began his career as a poet and later a stage and television actor, musician and storyteller. He has appeared in a number of notable films such as Kalushi: The Story of Solomon Mahlangu and A Million Colours. However, his most prominent role is his portrayal of the ruthless crime lord Nkunzebomvu "Nkunzi" Mhlongo on the most viewed television show in South Africa Uzalo. He has also appeared in several TV series such as Scandal!, Shreads and Dreams, Rhythm City, Intersexions, Sokhulu & Partners, and Making Cents with the Sitholes.

In 2016, he got his first starring role in television in a telenovela called "Ring of Lies".

In 2004, he wrote poems for the South African National Football Team during the AFCON tournament held in Tunisia. He also wrote and performed promo poems for the largest radio station in South Africa Ukhozi FM.

On June 22, 2019, Masoja Msiza alongside Dudu Khoza presented the first annual Cothoza Music Awards hosted by the multi-award-winning A cappella group Ladysmith Black Mambazo.

Film and television roles 
 Sokhulu & Partners (2011) (as Mthethwa)
 Zama Zama (2012) (as Oliver)
 Kalushi: The Story of Solomon Mahlangu (2016) (as Rev. Ndlovu)
 A Million Colours (2011)
 A Place Called Home (as Hudson)
 Inkaba (as Goodman)
 Intersexions (as Mhinga)
 Isibaya (as Bhodlimpi)
 Isidingo (as Saul)
 Jozi Streets (as Vusi)
 Mfolozi Street (as Mandla)
 Mthunzini.com (as Bheki)
 Rhythm City (as Joe Malefane)
 Ring of Lies (as Mandla)
 Shreds and Dreams (as Msoja Msiza)
Umlilo (as Welcome)
 Zabalaza (2013) (as Larry)
 Zone 14 (as Thomas)
Ya Lla (as Gate Guard)
 Uzalo (as Nkunzebomvu Mhlongo)

Poems and songs
 Time to Rhyme
 Babulawelani 
 The Click Poem
 Nokuthula
 The 8th Man
 Hamba Nami
 My Love 
 Hallelujah
 Mbalif
 My Skin
 Women and the Ocean

Personal life 
Msiza is a father of three, one son and two daughters.

Awards and nominations

See also 
Uzalo
Kalushi: The Story of Solomon
A Million Colours

References

External links

Living people
1965 births
People from Gauteng
South African poets
Zulu people
South African male actors